The 1898 Oregon Webfoots football team represented the University of Oregon in the 1898 college football season. It was the Webfoots' fifth season; they competed as an independent and were led by head coach Frank W. Simpson. They finished the season with a record of three wins and one loss (3–1).

Schedule

References

Oregon
Oregon Ducks football seasons
Oregon Webfoots football